Octavio Ianni (1926 in Itu, São Paulo – 2004 in São Paulo, São Paulo), Brazilian sociologist graduated, mastered and doctored at the University of São Paulo (USP) and was one of the founders of Cebrap. 
Ianni was a pupil of Florestan Fernandes from whom he got great influence.  These two sociologists and the former president of Brazil, Fernando Henrique Cardoso, are considered to be of great importance in Brazilian sociology.
Octavio Ianni had his political rights suspended in 1969 by the Brazilian military government of the time, what made him unable to continue lecturing in Brazil, right which would be recovered only in 1977, in Pontifíca Universidade Católica de São Paulo (PUC-SP). He is very famous because he wrote La formación del Estado populista en América Latina and wrote the "Lo conocían como Vito"

In his studies he made preferences for populism and imperialism.

1926 births
2004 deaths
Brazilian sociologists
University of São Paulo alumni
People from São Paulo